Dangerous and Moving is the second English-language album by Russian musical group t.A.T.u. and the English-language equivalent of the album Lyudi Invalidy. The album was first released on 5 October 2005 in Japan then on 10 October in the UK, 11 October in North America, and in Europe and Latin America, on 14 October. As of January 2010 the album sold 93,000 copies in the United States and had peaked at number 131 on Billboard 200.<ref name="ask billboard">{{Cite magazine|url=http://www.billboard.com/articles/columns/chart-beat/959544/ask-billboard-taking-peaks-nos-100-1?page=0%2C1|title=Ask Billboard: Taking Peaks," Nos. 100-1|date=29 January 2010|magazine=Billboard}}</ref>

Production
Production on Dangerous and Moving spanned from Los Angeles to London and Moscow. There were two notable recording sessions with the record's producer, Sergio Galoyan. The first took place in Moscow between 4 and 20 August 2004 with just Lena, producing songs like "Cosmos", "Sacrifice" (one demo featuring Claire Guy) and demos "All My Love" (an English counterpart to "Вся моя любовь"), "I Know", "One Love" and "You". The second recording session took place from 17 January to 18 April 2005 in Los Angeles with "Sacrifice", "Perfect Enemy" and the demo of "We Shout" (titled "Reach Out") also sung by Lena. Yulia was not present during the recording sessions due to her pregnancy.

Other demo versions of the songs are available online, such as "All About Us" (performed by the Veronicas), "Sacrifice" (with both Yulia and Lena), "Perfect Enemy" (recorded by Claire Guy and sometimes referred to as "Wrap It Up"), and "Обезьянка ноль".

Although Sting, Dave Stewart, Richard Carpenter, the Veronicas and Claire Guy did work on the album, they did not actually meet the girls for production. Sergio Galoyan became a liaison for the production. However, Richard Carpenter did meet the girls after the recording of the album at their video shoot for the single Friend or Foe. The video was shot on location at Bronson Cave in Hollywood, directed by James Cox, while the executive producer was Grant Cihlar for 1171 Production Group. According to the booklet, the album was recorded at eight different recording studios. The album cover photography and design was made by their own music group, TA Music.

Differences from Lyudi InvalidyLyudi Invalidy and Dangerous and Moving effectively have eight tracks in common, either in the form of being the same track or being English/Russian-counterparts:
 "Люди инвалиды" / "Dangerous and Moving" (49-second intro)
 "All About Us"
 "Loves Me Not"
 "Обезьянка ноль" (an English version, "Null and Void", exists but was not included)
 "Космос" / "Cosmos (Outer Space)"
 "Ничья" / "We Shout"
 "Новая модель" / "Perfect Enemy"
 "Люди инвалиды" / "Dangerous and Moving" (full version)

Three tracks from Lyudi Invalidy do not have counterparts on Dangerous and Moving:
 "Ты согласна"
 "Вся моя любовь" (An English version, "All My Love", exists in demo form with only Lena singing but was not recorded with both girls)
 "Что не хватает"

Four tracks from Dangerous and Moving do not have counterparts on Lyudi Invalidy:
 "Friend or Foe"
 "Gomenasai"
 "Craving"
 "Sacrifice"

The tracks that the two albums have in common were all reordered, with only tracks 1 and 4 being the same between the two; however, the full versions of "Люди инвалиды" / "Dangerous and Moving" are the final tracks of both albums (track 11 on Lyudi Invalidy and track 12 on Dangerous and Moving)

On this album, "Loves Me Not" has different music than the version on the Russian album counterpart Люди-инвалиды. Among other differences, the Lyudi Invalidy version features 29 seconds of instrumentals before the lyrics start, while the Dangerous and Moving version skips straight to the lyrics; and the Dangerous and Moving version features roaring guitars during the chorus, which are absent from the Lyudi Invalidy version.

The girls sing an extra verse in "Cosmos" after the second chorus; in "Космос", this is an instrumental break with no lyrics.

 Singles 
 "All About Us" was the lead single of the album, released in September 2005. It became a top-10 hit across Europe and the world. Peaking at number 8 in the UK Singles Chart and number 6 in the European Hot 100. Also it reached number 13 in the US Billboard Hot Dance Club Play chart. The video won Best Video MTV Russia 2006.
 "Friend or Foe" was released as the second single in December 2005. It peaked at number 33 in the European Hot 100 and number 48 in the UK Singles Chart.
 "Gomenasai" was released as the third single in Latin America and Asia and as the second in some European territories in May 2006. It wasn't released in the United States and the United Kingdom. The single reached number 59 in the European Hot 100.

Critical receptionDangerous and Moving was met with "mixed or average" reviews from critics. At Metacritic, which assigns a weighted average rating out of 100 to reviews from mainstream publications, this release received an average score of 53 based on 10 reviews.

In a review for AllMusic, critic reviewer Stephen Thomas Erlewine wrote: "Since the beats are monotonous, since the songs are insipid and forgettable, since the girls not only can't sing but have no on-record charisma, since there's no sense of style and, most importantly, sense of fun to this whole enterprise, Dangerous and Moving is the worst kind of pop music: the kind that is better to theorize about than to listen to" At Rolling Stone, Barry Walters said: "Although spunky cuties Julia Volkova and Lena Katina have improved their English-pronunciation skills, the hooks they're handed this second time around are decidedly duller, and the limitations of their vocal abilities are exaggerated, not concealed, by the bluntly simplistic tunes." 

Track listing

 The Deluxe limited edition comes with a fold-out guitar/piano music poster for "Gomenasai" and a bonus DVD containing "The Making of All About Us" video shoot (including the finished, edited video at the end of the program) and a t.A.T.u. Remix Package that has isolated stems for guitar, bass, drums, synths and vocals for the international version of the track "Loves Me Not".

 Charts
		

Certifications and sales

 Personnel / credits 
 t.A.T.u. - Vocals
 Tom Baker — Mastering
 Ed Buller - Producer
 Cindy Cooper — Production Coordination
 Sergio Galoyan - Producer, Composer
 Trevor Horn - Producer
 Tomoko Itoki — Product Manager
 David Junk — Executive Director
 Martin Kierszenbaum - Producer, A&R
 Andy Kubiszewski - Producer
 Robert Orton - Producer, Engineer, Mixing
 Boris Renski — Executive Producer
 Andrea Ruffalo — A&R
 Ami Spishock — Product Manager
 Phil Mucci — Photography
 T.A. Music — Design, Concept
 Tony Ugval — Engineer
 Xudoznik — Producer

Dangerous and Moving Tour (2005–2007)

 Setlist 
"Intro"
"Dangerous and Moving/"Lyudi Invalidy
"All About Us"
"Loves Me Not"
"Sacrifice"
"Chto Ne Khvatayet"
"We Shout"/ Nichya
"Friend or Foe"
"Obezyanka Nol"
"Gomenasai
"Perfect Enemy"/ Novaya Model
"Show Me Love"
"How Soon Is Now"
"30 Minutes"/ 30 Minut
"Not Gonna Get Us"/"Nas Ne Dagoniat"
"Ne Ve,Ne Boysia"
"All The Things She Said"/"Ya Soshla S Uma"
 Cosmos(Outer Space)

 See also 
 Dangerous and Moving Tour - The Associated Tour
 Truth: Live in St. Petersburg''

References 

T.A.T.u. albums
Interscope Records albums
2005 albums
Albums produced by Trevor Horn
Albums produced by Ed Buller